The Chicago Film Critics Association Award for Best Film is one of the annual awards given by the Chicago Film Critics Association.

Winners

1980s

1990s

2000s

2010s

2020s

See also
Academy Award for Best Picture

References

Film
Awards for best film
Lists of films by award